Juan Díaz Prendes (born 28 June 1977) is a Spanish retired footballer who played as a midfielder.

Career
Born in Gijón, Asturias, Juan Díaz joined Sporting de Gijón in 1991 at the age of 14.

After several years playing in Asturias, he made his professional debut in Segunda División with Sporting Gijón on 28 January 2001, in an away win against Universidad de Las Palmas by 2–0.

At the end of the 2005–06 season, Juan Díaz signed with Gimnàstic de Tarragona, freshly promoted to La Liga. He played his first game in the top tier on 27 August 2006, as a starter in the away win by 1–0 against RCD Espanyol.

He finally retired in 2013 after playing two years with Real Avilés.

References

External links

1977 births
Living people
Footballers from Gijón
Spanish footballers
Association football midfielders
La Liga players
Segunda División players
Segunda División B players
Tercera División players
Gimnàstic de Tarragona footballers
Real Avilés CF footballers
Sporting de Gijón players
RSD Alcalá players